General elections were held in Antigua and Barbuda on 8 March 1994. They were won by the governing Antigua Labour Party under the leadership of Lester Bird. Bird had been appointed leader of the ALP before the elections, after his father and predecessor Vere Bird announced his intention to retire. Lester Bird became Prime Minister after elections. Voter turnout was 62.3%. This was the first election contested by the United Progressive Party, under future Prime Minister Baldwin Spencer. 

The elections were described as neither free nor fair, as they were marred by several problems, including failing to guarantee a secret ballot, a deficient registration process open to abuse, and the inflation of the voter registry by 25% with the names of deceased people or emigrants.

Results

References

Antigua
Elections in Antigua and Barbuda
General election
March 1994 events in North America